B'z The Best "Ultra Treasure" is a compilation album by the Japanese hard rock duo B'z. It was released on September 17, 2008, and it is part of their 20th anniversary celebration. The album track listing was decided by fans who voted on a poll at the B'z 20th anniversary website. The fans could vote for all but three songs that have ever been released by B'z. "Brotherhood" was voted number one.

Track listing 
All tracks by B'z

Disc 1 
"Blowin'" -Ultra Treasure Style- – 3:57
"Wonderful Opportunity" – 4:38
"Mou Ichido Kiss Shitakatta" [もう一度キスしたかった] – 4:39
"Time" – 4:57
"Koi-Gokoro" [恋心(KOI-GOKORO)] – 3:48
"Run" – 3:52
"Sayonara Nankawa Iwasenai" [さよならなんかは言わせない] – 4:29
"Gekkou" [月光] – 5:31
"Koi Janaku Naru Hi" [恋じゃなくなる日] – 4:50
"Don't Leave Me" – 4:23
"Love Is Dead" – 5:48
"Haru" [春] – 5:39
"Motel" – 4:23
"You & I" – 4:07
"Yumemi Ga Oka" [夢見が丘] – 4:41
"Kienai Niji" [消えない虹] – 3:37

Disc 2 
"Brotherhood" – 5:44
"Swimmer-Yo!!" [スイマーよ!!] – 3:19
"Happiness" [ハピネス] – 4:51
"One" – 4:10
"F･E･A･R" -2008 Mix- – 3:46
"Nagai Ai" [ながい愛] – 5:35
"Rock Man" – 3:50
"Devil" – 3:35
"New Message" – 3:37
"Arakure" [アラクレ] – 3:26
"Yuruginai Mono Hitotsu" [ゆるぎないものひとつ] – 4:37
"Pierrot" [ピエロ] – 3:12
"Burn" -Fumetsu no Feisu- [Burn -フメツノフェイス-] – 3:50
"Home" (※ English Lyrics ver.) – 4:08
"Glory Days" (グローリーデイズ) – 4:26

Disc 3 
"Itsuka Mata Kokode" (いつかまたここで) – 5:34

Personnel 
Tak Matsumoto (松本 孝弘) – producer, guitarist
Koshi Inaba (稲葉 浩志) – vocalist

Charts
Oricon Sales Chart (Japan)

Certifications

References

External links
B'z official website 
B'z 20th anniversary special website , where people voted for songs to be put on the album. 

B'z compilation albums
Being Inc. compilation albums
2008 compilation albums